Events from 1960 in England

Incumbents

Events

January

February

March

April

May

June

July

August

September

October

November

December

Births
 March 16 – John Hemming, British Liberal Democrat politician and businessman
 November 18 – Kim Wilde, English singer and gardener

Deaths

See also
1960 in Northern Ireland
1960 in Scotland
1960 in Wales

References

 
England
Years of the 20th century in England
1960s in England